Wadi Degla Sporting Club is an Egyptian sports club. The club is related to Wadi Degla Holding, a construction company established in 1994.

In 2009–10, it was promoted to the Egyptian Premier League for the first time in its history.

History
In 2009–10 Egyptian Second Division, Wadi Degla made history. The team defeated El-Sekka El-Hadid 3–1 in the last week of the competition to seal promotion to the highest level of football in Egypt, Egyptian Premier League, for the first time in its history. It took Wadi Degla only one season to promote from the second division to the premier league. This is a historical achievement that was only reached once before by Al-Mokawloon Al-Arab (a.k.a. Arab Contractors) in 1981.

Satellite clubs
Wadi Degla has a large youth football academy. It is a similar project to that of ASEC Mimosas. The club has a close relationship with England's Arsenal Football Club.

The following clubs are affiliated with Wadi Degla:
  Lierse
  Arsenal
  Ergotelis

Honours

League
Egyptian Second Division
Winners: 2009–10

Cups
Egypt Cup
Runners-up: 2012–13

Performance in CAF competitions
FR = First round
SR = Second round

Performance in domestic competitions

Current squad

Out on loan

Managers
 Hesham Zakaria (1 July 2007 – 23 May 2010)
 Walter Meeuws (24 May 2010 – 30 June 2012)
 Hesham Zakaria (1 July 2012 – 31 December 2012)
 Mohamed Gamal (1 January 2013 – 5 April 2013)
 Hany Ramzy (6 April 2013 – 12 January 2014)
 Hesham Zakaria (13 January 2014 – 1 October 2014)
 Hamada Sedki (1 October 2014 – 14 January 2016)
 Patrice Carteron (15 January 2016 – 15 November 2016)
 Mido (15 November 2016 – December 2017)
 Tarek El Ashry (17 January 2018 – May 2018)
 Takis Gonias (12 June 2018 – 10 February 2020)
 Mustafa Al-Kharoubi (Caretaker) (10 February 2020 – 20 February 2020)
 Nikodimos Papavasiliou (20 February 2020 – 21 January 2021)
 Mario Salas (1 February 2021 – 27 May 2021)
 Abdul Baki Jamal (27 May 2021 – present)

Women 
Wadi Degla women SC, the women's team won the 2020 Egyptian Women's Premier League for the 11th time and will feature in the inaugural CAF Women's Champions League.

References

External links
 

 
Football clubs in Egypt
Football clubs in Cairo
Association football clubs established in 2002
2002 establishments in Egypt